Ferry Building may refer to:

 Auckland Ferry Building, New Zealand
 San Francisco Ferry Building, California, United States
 San Pedro Municipal Ferry Building, California, United States